Brian Katcher (born 1975) is an American author of young adult fiction.

Personal life 
Brian Katcher was born in St. Louis, Missouri, in 1975. He attended the University of Missouri in Columbia, Missouri, then traveled and worked a variety of jobs before beginning his career as a writer. As of 2021, Katcher was living in central Missouri with his wife and daughter.

Bibliography 

 Deacon Locke Went to Prom. Published May 9, 2017 by Katherine Tegen Books. 
 South Carolina Book Award Nominee for Young Adult (2020)
 The Improbable Theory of Ana and Zak. Published May 19, 2015 by Katherine Tegen Books. 
 Missouri Gateway Readers Award Nominee (2017)
 Everyone Dies in the End. Published March 15, 2014 by Dark Continents Publishing. 
 Almost Perfect. Published October 13, 2009 by Delacorte Books for Young Readers.
 Amazing Audiobooks for Young Adults (2013)
 Popular Paperbacks for Young Adults (2012)
 Stonewall Book Award (2011)
 James Cook Book Award Nominee (2011)
 American Library Association's Rainbow Project Book List (2010)
 Playing with Matches. Published July 8, 2008 by Delacorte Press.
 North Carolina Young Adult Book Award for High School (2011)
 Missouri Gateway Readers Award Nominee (2011)

References 

 Living people
American fiction writers
Writers from St. Louis
1975 births
Date of birth missing (living people)
American writers of young adult literature
21st-century American writers
University of Missouri alumni